The 2015–16 Montenegrin Cup was the 10th season of the Montenegrin knockout football tournament. The winner of the tournament received a berth in the first qualifying round of the 2016–17 UEFA Europa League. The defending champions were Mladost, who beat Petrovac in the final of the last competition. The competition featured 30 teams. It started on 16 September 2015 and ended with the final on 2 June 2016.

First round
Thirteen first round matches were played on 15 and 16 September 2015.

Summary

|}

Matches

Second round
Sixteen clubs competed in the second round played over two legs on 23 September and 21 October 2015.

Summary

|}

First legs

Second legs

Quarter-finals
Eight clubs competed in the quarter-finals played over two legs on 4, 25 November and 2 December 2015.

Summary

|}

First legs

Second legs

Semi-finals
Four clubs competed in the semi-finals played over two legs on 13 and 27 April 2016.

Summary

|}

First legs

Second legs

Final

References

External links
Montenegrin Cup 2015-2016 at Football Association of Montenegro's official site
Montenegrin Cup 2015-2016 at Soccerway

Montenegrin Cup seasons
Cup
Montenegrin Cup